The Barysh is a river in Ulyanovsk Oblast, Russia. It is a right tributary of the Sura (in Volga's drainage basin). The river flows over the northern parts of the Volga Upland. It is frozen over from November to April. The town of Barysh is situated by the river.

References

Rivers of Ulyanovsk Oblast